Giannis Ioannou (born 1931) is a Greek footballer. He competed in the men's tournament at the 1952 Summer Olympics.

References

External links
 

1931 births
Living people
Greece international footballers
Olympic footballers of Greece
Footballers at the 1952 Summer Olympics
Footballers from Piraeus
Association footballers not categorized by position
Greek footballers